is one of the 18 wards of the city of Yokohama in Kanagawa Prefecture, Japan. As of March 1, 2012, the ward had an estimated population of 332,488, with 156,198 households and a population density of 10,588.79 persons per km². The total area was 31.40 km². Kōhoku Ward has the largest population of Yokohama's 18 wards, and ranks second to Naka Ward in the total number of workplaces.

Geography
Kōhoku Ward is located in eastern Kanagawa Prefecture, and on the northeastern borders of the city of Yokohama.

Surrounding municipalities
Tsurumi Ward
Kanagawa Ward
Midori Ward
Tsuzuki Ward
Kawasaki, Kanagawa

History
The area around present-day Kōhoku Ward was formerly part of Tsuzuki District in Musashi Province. During the Edo period, it was a rural region classified as tenryō territory controlled directly by the Tokugawa shogunate, but administered through various hatamoto.  After the Meiji Restoration, the area became part of the new Kanagawa Prefecture in 1868. In the cadastral reform of April 1, 1889, the area was divided into numerous villages. In April 1939, it was annexed by the neighboring city of Yokohama.

Economy
Kōhoku Ward is largely a regional commercial center and bedroom community for central Yokohama, Kawasaki and Tokyo.

Companies headquartered in the ward include:
ANEST IWATA
Elna Co.

Local attractions
 Shin-Yokohama Ramen Museum
 Nissan Stadium, formerly the International Stadium Yokohama, the stadium in which the 2002 FIFA World Cup Final was held.
 Kozukue Castle, a castle ruin from the Sengoku period, one of the Continued Top 100 Japanese Castles.
 Yokohama Arena

Education

Colleges and universities
Keio University (Hiyoshi campus)

High schools
Kanagawa Prefectural Board of Education operates prefectural high schools:
 
 
 

Private high schools:
Keio Senior High School

Elementary and junior high schools
The  operates municipal elementary and junior high schools.

Municipal junior high schools:

 Hiyoshidai (日吉台)
 Hiyoshidai Nishi (日吉台西)
 Nitta (新田)
 Nippa (新羽)
 Otsuna (大綱)
 Shinohara (篠原)
 Shirosato (城郷)
 Takata (高田)
 Tarumachi (樽町)

Municipal elementary schools:

 Futoo (太尾)
 Hiyoshidai (日吉台)
 Hiyoshiminami (日吉南)
 Kikuna (菊名)
 Kitatsunashima (北綱島)
 Kohoku (港北)
 Komabayashi (駒林)
 Kozukue (小机)
 Mamedo (大豆戸)
 Minowa (箕輪)
 Morooka (師岡)
 Nitta (新田)
 Nippa (新羽)
 Osone (大曽根)
 Otsuna (大綱)
 Shimoda (下田)
 Shinohara (篠原)
 Shinohara Nishi (篠原西)
 Shin Yoshida (新吉田)
 Shin Yoshida Daini (No. 2) (新吉田第二)
 Shirosato (城郷)
 Takata (高田)
 Takata Higashi (高田東)
 Tsunashima (綱島)
 Tsunashima Higashi (綱島東)
 Yagami (矢上)

Additionally, the zones of Higashi Hongo Elementary School (東本郷小学校), Kamihashi Elementary School (神橋小学校) and Shirahata Elementary School (白幡小学校), not in Kohoku-ku, include portions of Kohoku-ku.

Transportation

Rail
JR Central – Tōkaidō Shinkansen
  
JR East – Yokohama Line
  –  –  
Yokohama City Transportation Bureau – Blue Line
  – – –
Yokohama City Transportation Bureau – Green Line
  –  – 
Tokyu Corporation – Tōkyū Tōyoko Line
  –  –  –  – 
Tokyu Corporation – Tōkyū Meguro Line

Highways
National Route 466

Airport access
An airport limousine bus service operates between Shin-Yokohama Prince Hotel and Shin-Yokohama Station and Narita Airport.

Notable people from Kōhoku Ward 

Masayuki Okano, professional soccer player
Ryo Fukawa, actor
Naoko Iijima, actress
Takako Tokiwa, actress
Daisuke Tonoike, professional soccer player
Salyu, singer
Shōsuke Tanihara, actor

References
 Kato, Yuzo. Yokohama Past and Present. Yokohama City University (1990).

External links

 Kōhoku Ward Office
 City of Yokohama statistics
 

Wards of Yokohama